Stefano Cecchi (born Turin, Italy 1971) is a record producer and entrepreneur.

Personal life 
Grandson of Sir Gabriello Cecchi (1914-2000), an industrial entrepreneur and "Cavaliere of the Italian Republic", Stefano grew up between the United States and Great Britain, where he graduated in Economics in 1993.

Career 
In the 1990s he opened and developed fashion agencies in London (Wild and Next). In 1999 Cecchi founded the record label Stefano Cecchi Records, introducing the "Buddha Bar Collection" phenomenon to Italy and launching musical architecture projects for fashion brands and luxury items, (LVMH, Fendi, Tod’s, Swatch, Vogue, Zegna, Maserati and Diesel).

Between 2000 and 2010 he co-created several fashion brands (Hydrogen, Bikinifuxia and Melody Maker) and opened concept stores (San Carlo dal 1973).

In 2014 he rebranded and relaunched the Gelati Cecchi 1936 family company.

In 2003 he joined the Board of the Torino Football Club.

Thanks to his ability to predict new trends creating highly successful products, he was even mentioned in the Treccani Italian encyclopedia.

As of 2021, he is focused on asset-backed investments and has set up the London-based private equity fund "Fondo per l'Arte - FpA", which invests in modern and contemporary art with a particular interest in emerging artists.

Books 
In 2012 Cecchi published "10 years, 1000 projects", an anthology of his works.

In 2013 he published "Play, the autobiography of a dream".

Sport 
Cecchi is also an ITF (International Tennis Federation) player in both over-35 and over-40 categories, specialized in men's doubles and mixed doubles. He won 14 international ITF tournaments, three medals in the European Championships, and played in the World Championships (with Fabrizio Gariglio), ranking second in the world and as a seeded player.

References 

Living people
1971 births
Italian record producers
Businesspeople from Turin